Fabián Israel Núñez Cortés (born 25 June 1992) is a Chilean footballer who plays for Deportes Temuco in the Chilean First Division B as an attacking midfielder.

External links
 

1992 births
Living people
Footballers from Santiago
Chilean footballers
Santiago Morning footballers
Cobresal footballers
Rangers de Talca footballers
Deportes Copiapó footballers
Deportes Puerto Montt footballers
Deportes Temuco footballers
Chilean Primera División players
Primera B de Chile players
Association football forwards
Association football midfielders